This is a list of tertiary educational institutions around the world offering bachelor's, master's or doctoral degrees in forestry or related fields. Where noted, the country's accreditation board standard has been used and cited. They are grouped by continent.

(For educational institutions with forestry technician or professional certificate programs see: List of forestry technical schools.)

Africa

Algeria
Abou Bakr Belkaïd University - Tlemcen
Higher National School of Forests - Khenchela

Benin
Faculty of Agronomic Sciences, National University of Benin
National School of wildlife and Protected Areas Management of Kandi, University of Parakou
Faculty of Agronomy, University of Parakou

Burkina Faso
Institute of Rural Development (IDR), Polytechnic University of Bobo-Dioulasso
Life and Earth Sciences (UFR/SVT), University of Ouagadougou

Cameroon
The National Forestry School of Cameroon,  location: Mbalmayo, the centre region of Cameroon
French Abbre.: Ecole Nationale des Eaux et Forêts de Mbalmayo

Côte d'Ivoire

 College of Agronomy, Félix Houphouët-Boigny National Polytechnic Institute, Yamoussoukro

Egypt
Forestry and Wood Technology Department, Faculty of Agriculture, Alexandria University.

Ethiopia
 Burie College of Forestry, Debremarkos University
 Haramaya College of Forestry, Haramaya University
 Wollo University
 Wondo Genet College of Forestry and Natural Resources, Hawassa University

Ghana
 Department of Renewable Natural Resources, University for Development Studies
 Kwame Nkrumah University of Science and Technology
 Faculty of Forest Resources Technology
 Faculty of Renewable Natural Resources
 Department of Wood Science and Technology
School of Natural Resources, University of Energy and Natural Resources,

Guinea
Higher Institute of Agronomy and Veterinary Studies, Faranah

Kenya
 Department of Forestry, University of Eldoret
 Kenya Forestry College (Londiani)
 Kenya Forestry Research Institute

Madagascar
 Department of Water and Forests, School of Agronomy, University of Antananarivo

Malawi
 Malawi College of Forestry and Wildlife ( Certificate and Diploma Program) https://sites.google.com/view/malawicollegeforestrywildlife/home
 Bunda College of Agriculture, University of Malawi
 Department of Forestry, Mzuzu University

Morocco
 National School for Forest Engineers (ENFI Rabat-Salé)

Mozambique
Department of Forestry Eduardo Mondlane University

Nigeria

 Department of Forestry and Wildlife Resources Management, Cross River University of Technology
 Department of Forestry and Wildlife, Delta State University, Abraka
 Department of Forest Resources and Wildlife Management, Ekiti State University, Ado Ekiti
 Department of Forestry Technology, Federal College of Forestry, Ibadan
 Department of Forestry and Wood Technology, Federal University of Technology Akure
 Department of and Wildlife Technology, Federal University of Technology, Owerri
 Department of Forestry and Environmental Management, Michael Okpara University of Agriculture, Umudike
 Department of Forestry and Wildlife Management, University of Agriculture, Abeokuta
 Department of Forest Production and Products, University of Agriculture, Makurdi
 Department of Forestry and Wildlife, University of Benin
 Department of Forestry and Wildlife Resources Management, University of Calabar, Calabar
 Department of Forest Resources Management, University of Ibadan
 Department of Forest Resources Management, University of Ilorin
 Department of Forestry and Wildlife, University of Maiduguri
 Department of Forestry and Wildlife Management, University of Port Harcourt
 Forestry and Wildlife, University of Uyo
 Forestry and Wildlife, Uthman dan Fodiyo University, Sokoto

Senegal
Institute of Environmental Sciences, Cheikh Anta Diop University
Ecole Nationale Supérieure d'Agriculture de Thiès (ENSA), University of Thiès, Thiès

South Africa
 Department of Forest and Wood Science, Faculty of AgriSciences, University of Stellenbosch
 Department of Forestry, Fort Cox College of Agriculture and Forestry, King William's Town
 Department of Forestry, School of Agriculture, University of Venda, Thohoyandou
 Forest Science Postgraduate Program, University of Pretoria
 School of Natural Resource Management, Nelson Mandela University, George (Western Cape) campus

Sudan
College of Forestry and Range Science, Sudan University of Science and Technology
College of Natural Resources and Environmental Studies, University of Juba
Faculty of Forestry, University of Khartoum
Faculty of Forestry and Range Science, Upper Nile University
Faculty of Natural Resources and Environmental Studies, University of Kordofan

Tanzania
Beekeeping Training Institute, Tabora
Forestry Industries Training Institute
Faculty of Forestry and Nature Conservation, Sokoine University of Agriculture
Forestry Training Institute, Olmotonyi
Institute of Resources Assessment, University of Dar es Salaam

Tunisia
School of Rural Development, Water, and Forests, National Agricultural Institute of Tunisia
Silvopastoral Institute of Tabarka

Uganda
 Faculty of Forestry and Nature Conservation, Makerere University
 Nyabyeya Forestry College, Masindi

Zambia
School of Forestry and Wood Sciences, Copperbelt University
Zambia Forestry College

Zimbabwe
 Bindura University of Science Education
 Department of Forest Resources and Wildlife Management, National University of Science and Technology, Bulawayo
 Zimbabwe College of Forestry, Mutare

Asia

Afghanistan
 Department of Forestry, Bamyan University
 Department of Forestry and Natural Resources, Kabul University
 Department of Forest Sciences, Kunar University
 Department of Forestry, Paktia University
Department of Forestry and Environmental Sciences, Laghman University
Department of Forestry and Horticulture Sciences, Balkh University
Department of Forestry, Badakhshan University,
Department of Forest Sciences, Herat University

Bangladesh
 Department of Agroforestry and Environment, Bangabandhu Sheikh Mujibur Rahman Agricultural University, Dhaka
 Forestry and Wood Technology Discipline, Khulna University, Khulna
 Department of Forestry and Environmental Science, Shahjalal University of Science and Technology, Sylhet
 Institute of Forestry and Environmental Sciences, University of Chittagong, Chittagong

China

 Beijing Forestry University
 Central South University of Forestry and Technology
 College of Forestry, Guizhou University
 College of Horticulture and Forestry Sciences, Huazhong Agricultural University, Wuhan, Hubei
 College of Forestry and Horticulture, Henan Agricultural University
 Fujian Agriculture and Forestry University
 Nanjing Forestry University
 North West A&F University
 Northeast Forestry University
 Sichuan Agricultural University
 Southwest Forestry University
 Zhejiang Forestry University

India

 Forest Research Institute, Dehradun [ICFRE (An autonomous government body governed by Ministry of Environment Forest and Climate Change)].
 College of Horticulture and Forestry, Central Agricultural University, Pasighat, Arunachal Pradesh
 College of Horticulture and Forestry, Punjab Agricultural University, Ludhiana
 College of Forestry, Dr. Balasaheb Sawant Konkan Krishi Vidyapeeth University (BSKKV), Dapoli, Maharashtra
 College of Forestry, Odisha University of Agriculture and Technology, Bhubaneswar, Odisha
 College of Forestry, Kerala Agricultural University
 College of Forestry, Ponnampet, UAHS, Shimoga
 College of Forestry, Sirsi, University of Agricultural Sciences, Dharwad
 College of Forestry and Hill Agriculture, Ranichauri, G. B. Pant University of Agriculture and Technology, Pantnagar now with VCSG University of Horticulture & Forestry, Bharsar, Uttarakhand
 College of Horticulture and Forestry, Maharana Pratap University, Jhalawar, Rajasthan now with Agriculture University, Kota, Rajasthan
 Department of Applied Science, North Eastern Regional Institute of Science and Technology (NERIST), Nirjuli, Arunachal Pradesh
 Department of Ecology and Environmental Science, Assam University, Silchar, Assam
 Department of Forestry, School of Earth Sciences and Natural Resources Management, Tanhril, Aizawl, Mizoram
 Department of Forest Sciences, Desh Bhagat University (DBU), Mandi Gobindgarh, Punjab
 Department of Forestry, Dr. Panjabrao Deshmukh Krishi Vidyapeeth University (PDKV), Akola, Maharashtra
 Department of Forestry, Wildlife and Environmental Sciences, Guru Ghasidas University, Bilaspur, Chhattisgarh
 Department of Forestry, Hemwati Nandan Bahuguna Garhwal University
 Department of Forestry, Jawaharlal Nehru Agricultural University, Jabalpur, Madhya Pradesh
 Engineering colleges in India, IIT Bombay Sciences and Technology,
 Aspee College of Forestry and Horticulture, Navsari Agricultural University, Navsari, Gujarat
 Dr. Yashwant Singh Parmar University of Horticulture and Forestry, Nauni, Solan, Himachal Pradesh
 Forest College and Research Institute, Tamil Nadu Agricultural University, Mettupalayam, Tamil Nadu
 Forest Department, Forest Rangers College, Angul, Orissa
 Gujarat Forest Rangers College, Rajpipla, Gujarat
 Indian Institute of Forest Management, Bhopal
 Department of Forestry and Biodiversity, Tripura University, Suryamaninagar, Agartala, Tripura
 College of Forestry, Banda University of Agriculture and technology Banda Uttar Pradesh India.

Indonesia

Faculty of Agriculture, Khairun University
Faculty of Agriculture, Padjadjaran University
Faculty of Forestry, Bengkulu University
Faculty of Forestry, Bogor Agricultural University
Faculty of Forestry, Domuga Kotamubago University
Faculty of Forestry, Gadjah Mada University
Faculty of Forestry, Haluoleo University
Faculty of Forestry, Hasanuddin University
Faculty of Forestry, Institut Pertanian Stiper
Faculty of Forestry, Kuningan University
Faculty of Forestry, Lambung Mangkurat University
Faculty of Forestry, Lampung University
Faculty of Forestry, Lancang Kuning Riau University
Faculty of Forestry, Merdeka Madiun University
Faculty of Forestry, Muhammadiyah Malang University
Faculty of Forestry, Muhammadiyah Sumatera Barat University
Faculty of Forestry, Mulawarman University
Faculty of Forestry, Negeri Papua University
Faculty of Forestry, Nusa Bangsa University
Faculty of Forestry, Palangkaraya University
Faculty of Forestry, Pattimura University
Faculty of Forestry, Sam Ratulangi University
Faculty of Forestry, Satria University
Faculty of Forestry Engineering, Sumatera Institute of Technology
Faculty of Forestry, Tadulako University
Faculty of Forestry, Tanjungpura University
Faculty of Forestry, University of Jambi
Faculty of Forestry, University of North Sumatra
Faculty of Forestry, Winaya Mukti University
School of Life Sciences and Technology, Bandung Institute of Technology

Iran

 Giulan University
 College of Agriculture, Gonbad-e Qabus
 Gorgan University of Agricultural Sciences and Natural Resources, Faculty of Forest Sciences
 Islamic Azad University of Chalous
 Islamic Azad University of Lahijan
 Islamic Azad University, Science and Research Branch, Tehran
 Kalak Natural Resources Training Center
 Kelarabad Natural Resources Training Center
 Kordestan University
 Sari Agricultural and Natural Resources University
 Semnan University, Natural Resources and Desert Study Faculties, Semnan Province
 Tarbiat Modares University
 Tehran University
 Urmia University
 Yasouj University, Agricultural and Natural Resources Department, Faculty of Forestry
 Zabol University, Department of Wood and Paper Sci.and Technol, Faculty of Natural Resources
 Shahrekord University, Faculty of Natural Resources and Earth Sciences

Japan

Department of Agriculture and Forest Science, University of Miyazaki
Department of Forest Science, Iwate University
Department of Forest Products, Kyushu University
Department of Forest and Environment, Shimane University
Department of Forest Sciences, Shinshu University
Department of Forest Science, University of Tokyo
Department of Forest Science, Utsunomiya University
Division of Forest and Biomaterials Science, Kyoto University
Tokyo University of Agriculture and Technology

Laos
Bolikhamxay Agriculture and Forestry School
Champasack Agriculture and Forestry School
Champasack University
Department of Forest Resources, Faculty of Agriculture and Forest Resources, Souphanouvong University
Dongkhamxang School of Agriculture and Forestry
Faculty of Forest Science, National University of Laos (NUOL)
Louang Prabang Agriculture and Forestry School
Muang Mai School of Forestry
Sepone Agroforestry Training Center

Malaysia

Forest Resource Technology, Universiti Malaysia Kelantan (UMK)
School of International Tropical Forestry, Universiti Malaysia Sabah (UMS)
Institute of Biodiversity and Environmental Conservation, Universiti Malaysia Sarawak (UNIMAS)
Faculty of Forestry, Universiti Putra Malaysia (UPM)
School of Industrial Technology, Universiti Sains Malaysia (USM)
Faculty of Applied Sciences, Universiti Teknologi MARA (UiTM)

Mongolia

Department of Forestry, Mongolian State University of Agriculture (MSUA)
Department of Forest Technology, Mongolian University of Science and Technology (MUST)
Department of Forestry, National University of Mongolia (NUM)

Myanmar
University of Forestry (Yezin)

Nepal
 Faculty of Forestry, Agriculture and Forestry University, Hetauda
 Lord Buddha College, Kathmandu
 Mahuregadhi Polytechnic Institute, CTEVT, Nunthala Khotang
 Institute of Forestry, Pokhara (central campus)
 Institute of Forestry, Hetauda
 Tribhuvan University
 Kathmandu Forestry College, Kathmandu

Pakistan

 Agricultural Research Institute, Quetta
 Department of Forestry, Shaheed Benazir Bhutto University, Sheringal Dir Upper Khyber Pakhtunkhwa, Pakistan
 Department of Forestry and Range Management, Faculty of Forestry, Range Management and Wildlife, Pir Mehr Ali Shah Arid Agriculture University
 Department of Forestry and Range Management, Bahauddin Zakariya University, Multan
 Department of Forestry and Wildlife Management, University of Haripur, Haripur District
 Department of Forestry, Range Management, and Wildlife, University of Agriculture, Faisalabad
 Pakistan Forest Institute, Peshawar
 Punjab Forest School, Bahawalpur
 School of Agriculture and Forestry, University of Swat
 Sindh Agriculture University, Hyderabad
 University of Agriculture (Peshawar)
 Institute of Agriculture Sciences and Forestry, University of Swat, Swat

Philippines
Bilar Campus, Bohol Island State University (BISU)
Cabagan Campus, Isabela State University (ISU)
College of Agricultural Sciences and Natural Resources, Caraga State University (CarSU)
College of Agriculture, Food and Sustainable Development (CAFSD), Mariano Marcos State University (MMSU)
College of Agriculture, Forestry and Fisheries (CAFF), Negros Oriental State University (NoRSU)
College of Agriculture, Forestry Department (SLSU-Lucban Quezon)
College of Forestry, Benguet State University (BSU)
College of Forestry, Nueva Vizcaya State University (NVSU)
College of Forestry and Environmental Science, Central Mindanao University (CMU)
College of Forestry and Environmental Studies, Mindanao State University (MSU)
College of Forestry and Natural Resources, University of the Philippines Los Baños (UPLB)
College of Forestry and Natural Resources, Visayas State University (VSU)
College of Forestry and Environmental Studies, Western Mindanao State University (WMSU)
Department of Forestry University of Southeastern Philippines (USeP-, Tagum-Mabini Campus, Tagum City, Davao del Norte)
Echague Campus, Isabela State University (ISU)
Forestry and Environmental Studuies University of Mindanao (UM) Davao City
Gonzaga Campus, Cagayan State University (CSU)
Institute of Agriculture and Forestry, Ilocos Sur Polytechnic State College (ISPSC - Sta. Maria Campus) Santa Maria, Ilocos Sur
Institute of Agriculture and Forestry, Tarlac College of Agriculture (TCA)
Institute of Agroforestry and Watershed Management, Don Mariano Marcos Memorial State University (DMMMSU)
Institute of Arts and Sciences, Pampanga Agricultural College (PAC)
Tanay Campus, University of Rizal System (URS)

South Korea
 Department of Forestry, Kyungpook National University
 Department of Forest Resources, College of Life Science, Gyeongsang National University of Science and Technology
 College of Forest and Environmental Sciences, Kangwon National University
 Department of Forest Environmental Sciences, College of Agriculture and Life Sciences, Seoul National University 
 Division of Forest Resources, Chonnam National University
 Department of Forest Resources, Yeungnam University

Sri Lanka
Faculty of Agriculture, Rajarata University of Sri Lanka
Faculty of Agriculture, University of Peradeniya
Faculty of Agriculture, University of Ruhuna
Faculty of Applied science,(Department of Forestry & Environmental science)University of Sri Jayewardenepura

Taiwan
Department of Forestry and Natural Resources, National Chiayi University
Department of Forestry and Natural Resources, National Ilan University
Department of Forestry and Nature Conservation, Chinese Culture University
Department of Forestry, National Chung Hsing University
Department of Forestry, National Pingtung University of Science and Technology
School of Forestry and Resource Conservation, National Taiwan University

Thailand
Faculty of Forestry, Kasetsart University
Agroforestry, Maejo University
[FORRU-CMU], Chiang Mai University

Vietnam
 Bắc Giang University of Agriculture and Forestry
 College of Agriculture and Forestry, Huế University, Huế
 Department of Agriculture and Forestry, Tây Nguyên University, Buôn Ma Thuột, Đắk Lắk
 Faculty of Forestry, Ho Chi Minh City University of Agriculture and Forestry (Nong Lam University), Thủ Đức
 Thái Nguyên University of Agriculture and Forestry, Thái Nguyên City
 Vietnam National University of Forestry (Formerly Vietnam Forestry University, and before that Xuân Mai Forestry University), Xuan Mai, Hanoi

Europe

Albania
 Faculty of Forest Sciences, Agricultural University of Tirana

Austria
 Department of Forest- and Soil Sciences, University of Natural Resources and Life Sciences, Vienna
 Ossiach forestry training centre, Bundesforschungs- und Ausbildungszentrum für Wald, Naturgefahren und Landschaft

Belarus
 Faculty of Forestry, Belarusian State Technological University
 Institute of Forest Science, NASB

Belgium
 Department of Forest and Nature Management, Gembloux Agro-Bio Tech, University of Liège (Gembloux)
 Earth & Life Institute, Departement of Forestry, University of Louvain (Louvain-la-Neuve)
 Department of Forest, Nature and Landscape, Katholieke Universiteit Leuven (Leuven)
 Laboratory of Forestry, Ghent University (Ghent)
 Department of Agronomy, Haute École de la Province de Liège (Theux)

Bosnia and Herzegovina
 Faculty of Forestry, University of Banja Luka
 Faculty of Forestry, University of Bihać
 Faculty of Forestry, University of Istočno Sarajevo
 Faculty of Forestry, University of Sarajevo

Bulgaria

 Faculty of Forestry, University of Forestry, Sofia

Croatia
 Faculty of Forestry, University of Zagreb

Cyprus
 Cyprus Forestry College

Czech Republic

 Faculty of Forestry and Wood Technology, Mendel University Brno
 Faculty of Forestry and Wood Sciences, Czech University of Life Sciences Prague

Denmark
 Danish Forestry College
 Forest and Landscape College, University of Copenhagen

Estonia
Institute of Forestry and Rural Engineering, Estonian University of Life Sciences

Finland

 Degree Program in Forestry, Tampere University of Applied Sciences
 Department of Forest Products Technology, Helsinki University of Technology
 Faculty of Agriculture and Forestry, University of Helsinki
 Faculty of Science and Forestry, University of Eastern Finland
 Forest and Wood Technology, Karelia University of Applied Sciences
 Forestry and Wood Technology, Pohjois-Savo Polytechnic
 Forestry Study Programme, Häme Polytechnic
 Lab of Pulping Technology, Åbo Akademi University
 Pieksämäki School of Forestry, Mikkeli University of Applied Sciences
 Swedish Vocational Institute, Vasa
 Unit of Natural Resources, Sodankylä Vocational Institute (SKAI)

France
 Dynamiques Forestières dans l'Espace Rural (Dynafor), National University of Agronomy Toulouse (ENSAT)
 Meymac Forestry College
 École supérieure du bois (ESB), Nantes
 Gestion Intégrée des Agrosystèmes et des Forêts, École nationale supérieure des sciences agronomiques de Bordeaux Aquitaine (Bordeaux Sciences Agro), University of Bordeaux
 École nationale supérieure des technologies et industries du bois (ENSTIB), Université Henri Poincaré
 Javols Forestry College
 Crogny Forestry College
 National College of Agricultural Engineering, Water and Forestry (ENGREF), Agro ParisTech, Paris Institute of Technology for Life, Food and Environmental Sciences
 ECAM Lyon, Formation ingénieur bois

Germany
 Department of Forest Sciences, Dresden University of Technology
 Eberswalde University for Sustainable Development (FH)
 Faculty of Forest and Environment
 Faculty of Wood Technology and Wood Processing
Faculty of Wood Technology and Wood Processing, Rosenheim University of Applied Sciences
Faculty of Forestry, Rottenburg University of Applied Forest Sciences
Faculty of Forestry, School of Life Sciences, Technical University of Munich
Faculty of Resource Management, HAWK - University of Applied Sciences and Arts - Hildesheim/Holzminden/Goettingen
Faculty of Forestry, University of Applied Sciences Erfurt
Faculty of Forest and Environmental Sciences, University of Freiburg
Faculty of Forest Sciences and Forest Ecology, University of Göttingen
Department of Wood and Forestry, University of Hamburg
Faculty of Forest Science, University of Munich

Greece
 Department of Forest and Natural Environment Sciences, School of Geosciences, International Hellenic University
 Department of Forestry and Natural Environmental Management at Karpenisi, Technological Educational Institute of Lamia
 Department of Forestry, Management of the Environment and Natural Resources at Orestiada, Democritus University of Thrace
 Faculty of Forestry and Natural Environment, Aristotle University of Thessaloniki
 Technological Educational Institute of Larissa
 Department of Forestry and Natural Environmental Management at Karditsa
 Department of Wood & Furniture Design and Technology at Karditsa

Hungary
 Faculty of Forestry, University of Sopron, Sopron

Italy
 Department for Innovation in Biological, Agro-food and Forest systems, University of Tuscia
 Dipartimento di Scienze Agrarie, Forestali e Alimentari, University of Torino
 Faculty of Agriculture, University of Ancona
 Faculty of Agriculture, University of Basilicata
 Faculty of Agriculture, University of Florence
 Faculty of Agriculture, University of Molise
 Faculty of Agriculture, University of Padua
 Faculty of Agriculture, University of Palermo
 Faculty of Agriculture, University of Reggio Calabria
 Faculty of Agriculture, University of Sassari
 Faculty of Agriculture and Forestry industry University of Milan

Latvia
 Forest Faculty, Latvia University of Life Sciences and Technologies

Lithuania
 Faculty of Forestry, Lithuanian University of Agriculture
 Faculty of Forestry and Landscape Planning, Kaunas College of Forestry and Environmental Engineering

The Netherlands
 Forest Ecology and Forest Management Group, Department of Environmental Sciences, Wageningen University
 Tropical Forestry, Department of Environmental Science, Van Hall Larenstein University, Velp

North Macedonia
 Faculty of Forestry, Ss. Cyril and Methodius University of Skopje

Norway
 Faculty of Applied Ecology and Agricultural Sciences, Inland Norway University of Applied Sciences
 Faculty of Society and Nature, Nord-Trøndelag University College
 Norwegian University College for Agriculture and Rural Development
 Department of Ecology and Natural Resources, Norwegian University of Life Sciences
 Pulp and Paper Technology Group, Norwegian University of Science and Technology

Poland
 Faculty of Forestry, Agricultural University of Cracow, Kraków
 Faculty of Forestry Bialystok Technical University
 University of Life Sciences in Poznań
 Faculty of Forestry
 Faculty of Wood Technology
 Faculty of Forestry, University of Warmia and Mazury in Olsztyn, Olsztyn
 Warsaw University of Life Science
 Faculty of Forestry
 Faculty of Wood Technology

Portugal
 Department of Forestry, Agrarian School of the Polythecnic Institute of Coimbra
 Department of Forestry, University of Évora
 Forestry Department, Higher Institute of Agronomy of the University of Lisbon
 Forestry Department, University of Trás-os-Montes and Alto Douro
 Wood Engineering Department, School of Technology and Management of the Polytechnic Institute of Viseu

Romania
 Colegiul Silvic Theodor Pietraru, highschool in Branesti, județul Ilfov
 Department of Forestry and Agritourism, Faculty of Natural Sciences, Engineering and Information Science, Vasile Goldiş Western University, Arad
 Department of Silviculture, Faculty of Horticulture, University of Agricultural Sciences and Veterinary Medicine, Cluj-Napoca
 Faculty of Silviculture, Ştefan cel Mare University, Suceava

 Transylvania University, Brașov
 Faculty of Silviculture and Forest Operations
 Faculty of Wood Industry

 Departament of Silviculture, Faculty of Agriculture, University of Agronomic Sciences and Veterinary Medicine of Bucharest USAMV Bucharest http://www.agro-bucuresti.ro/english/

Russia

 Faculty of Forestry, Arkhangelsk State Technical University
 Forest Faculty, Moscow State Forest University
 Research Institute of Forest Genetics and Plant Breeding, Voronezh
 Saint Petersburg State Forest Technical University
 Saint Petersburg State Technological University of Plant Polymers
 Siberian State Aerospace University
 Siberian State Technological University
 Sukachev Institute of Forest, Russian Academy of Sciences, Moscow
 Ural State Forest Engineering University
 Voronezh State Academy of Forestry Engineering
 Volga State University of Technology
 Forest Research Institute of the Karelian Research Centre of the Russian Academy of Sciences
 Federal State Budgetary Educational Institution of Higher Education “Izhevsk State Agricultural Academy” (FSBEI HE Izhevsk SAA)
 Institute of Forest Science, RAS

Serbia
 Faculty of Forestry, University of Belgrade

Slovakia
 Faculty of Forestry, Technical University in Zvolen

Slovenia
 Faculty of Forestry, University of Ljubljana

Spain

 Polytechnic University of Valencia
 Senior Technical College of Forestry Engineering (ETSI Montes), Technical University of Madrid
 Universidad Católica de Ávila
 Department of Forest Engineering, Tech School of Agrifood and Forestry Engineering (ETSIAM), University of Córdoba
 Forestry and Environmental Engineering, Universidad de Extremadura (Plasencia)
 Universidad de Huelva, Huelva
 Universidad de León (Ponferrada)
 School of Agrifood and Forestry Science and Engineering (ETSEA), University of Lleida
 Universidad de Oviedo, Escuela politécnica de Mieres, Sistemas Forestales Atlánticos (GIS-Forest)
 Universidad de Santiago de Compostela (Lugo)
 Universidad de Valladolid (Palencia)
 Universidad de Vigo - Forestry Faculty of Pontevedra

Sweden
 Division of Wood Technology and Processing, KTH Royal Institute of Technology, Stockholm
 Faculty of Forestry, Swedish University of Agricultural Sciences, Umeå and Skinnskatteberg
 Luleå University of Technology, Skellefteå

Switzerland
 Department of Environmental Sciences, Swiss Federal Institute of Technology Zürich
 School of Agricultural, Forest and Food Sciences HAFL

Turkey
 Faculty of Forestry, Artvin Çoruh University
 Faculty of Forestry, Bartın University
 Faculty of Forestry, Bursa Technical University
 Faculty of Forestry, Çankırı Karatekin University 
 Faculty of Forestry, Duzce University
 Faculty of Forestry, Istanbul University-Cerrahpasa 
 Faculty of Forestry, Izmir Katip Celebi University 
 Faculty of Forestry, Kahramanmaraş Sütçü İmam University
 Faculty of Forestry, Karabuk University
 Faculty of Forestry, Karadeniz Technical University
 Faculty of Forestry, Kastamonu University
 Faculty of Forestry, Isparta University of Applied Sciences

Ukraine
 Faculty of Forestry, National Agriculture University of Ukraine
 National Forestry University of Ukraine

United Kingdom
 Agricultural Extension and Rural Development Department, University of Reading
 Centre for Rural Development and Training, University of Wolverhampton
 Crop and Environment Sciences, Harper Adams University
 Department of Forestry, University of Aberdeen
 National School of Forestry, University of Cumbria
 Oxford Forestry Institute, Oxford University
 School of Forestry, University of Edinburgh
 School of the Environment, Natural Resources and Geography (SENRG) Bangor University
 Scottish School of Forestry, University of the Highlands and Islands

North America

Canada
 Faculty of Natural Resources Management, Lakehead University
 Faculty of Forestry, Université de Moncton, New Brunswick
 Faculty of Forestry, Geography and Geomatics, Université Laval, Quebec City
 Faculty of Agricultural, Life and Environmental Sciences, University of Alberta
 Faculty of Forestry, University of British Columbia
 Faculty of Forestry and Environmental Management, University of New Brunswick
 University of Northern British Columbia
 Faculty of Natural Resources Management
 Faculty of Forestry
 Faculty of Forestry, University of Toronto

Mexico
 Department of Forestry, Universidad Autónoma Agraria Antonio Narro
 Division of Forest Sciences, Universidad Autónoma Chapingo
 Facultad de Agrobiología "Presidente Juarez"- Universidad Michoacana de San Nicolas de Hidalgo
 Faculty of Agricultural and Forest Sciences, Universidad Autónoma de Chihuahua
 Faculty of Forest Sciences, Universidad Autónoma de Nuevo León
 Faculty of Forest Sciences, Universidad Juárez del Estado de Durango
 Faculty of Wood Engineering and Technology, Universidad Michoacana de San Nicolás de Hidalgo
 Forestry Program, Colegio de Postgraduados
 Institute of Agricultural Sciences, Universidad Autónoma del Estado de Hidalgo
 Universidad del Mar
 University Center of Biological and Agricultural Sciences, Universidad de Guadalajara

United States

Northeast
 College of Natural Sciences, Forestry and Agriculture, University of Maine
 Department of Forest and Natural Resources Management, SUNY Environmental Science and Forestry
 Department of Natural Resources and the Environment, University of New Hampshire
 Department of Natural Resources Conservation, University of Massachusetts Amherst
 Department of Plant Science and Landscape Architecture, University of Maryland
 Division of Forestry, West Virginia University
 Parks and Forest Resources, Unity College (Maine)
 Rubenstein School of Environment and Natural Resources, The University of Vermont
 School of the Environment, Yale University
 School of Forest Resources, Pennsylvania State University
 School of Natural Resource Management and Ecology, Paul Smith's College

Midwest
 College of Natural Resources, University of Wisconsin–Stevens Point
 Department of Forest and Wildlife Ecology, University of Wisconsin–Madison
 Department of Forest Resources, University of Minnesota
 Department of Forestry, Michigan State University
 Department of Forestry, Southern Illinois University
 Department of Forestry and Natural Resources, Purdue University
 Department of Natural Resource Ecology and Management, Iowa State University
 Department of Natural Resources and Environmental Sciences, University of Illinois at Urbana-Champaign
 School of Forest Resources & Environmental Science, Michigan Technological University
 School of Natural Resources, Ohio State University
 The School of Natural Resources, University of Missouri
 School of Natural Resources & Environment, University of Michigan

South
 Arthur Temple College of Forestry and Agriculture, Stephen F. Austin State University
 Center for Forestry and Ecology, Alabama A&M University
 College of Forest Resources, Mississippi State University
 College of Natural Resources, North Carolina State University
 Department of Ecosystem Science and Management, Texas A&M University
 Department of Forest Resources, Abraham Baldwin Agricultural College
 Department of Forest Resources, Clemson University
 Department of Forest Resources and Environmental Conservation, Virginia Polytechnic Institute and State University
 Department of Forestry, University of Kentucky
 Department of Forestry, Wildlife and Fisheries, University of Tennessee
 Department of Natural Resource Ecology and Management, Oklahoma State University
 Nicholas School of the Environment, Duke University
 School of Forest Resources and Conservation, University of Florida
 School of Forestry, Louisiana Tech University
 School of Forestry & Natural Resources, University of Arkansas at Monticello
 School of Forestry and Wildlife Sciences, Auburn University
 School of Renewable Natural Resources, Louisiana State University
 Warnell School of Forestry and Natural Resources, University of Georgia

West
 College of Agriculture and Environmental Sciences, University of California, Davis
 College of Forestry, Oregon State University
 College of Forestry and Conservation, University of Montana
 College of Natural Resources, University of California, Berkeley
 College of Natural Resources, Department of Forest, Rangeland, and Fire Sciences, University of Idaho
 Department of Forest, Rangeland, and Watershed Stewardship, Colorado State University
 Department of Forest Sciences, University of Alaska Fairbanks
 Department of Forestry and Wildland Resources, Humboldt State University
 Department of Natural Resources Management, California Polytechnic State University
 Department of Wildland Resources, Utah State University
 School of Environment and Forest Sciences, University of Washington
 School of Forestry, Northern Arizona University
 School of the Environment, Washington State University

Oceania

Australia
 College of Medicine, Biology and Environment, Australian National University
 Department of Forest and Ecosystem Science, University of Melbourne
 School of Environmental Science and Management, Southern Cross University (Lismore)

New Zealand
 School of Forestry, University of Canterbury (Christchurch)
 Timber Technology Campus, Waiariki Institute of Technology

Papua New Guinea
 Bulolo Forestry College
 Forestry Department, Papua New Guinea University of Technology

South America and Caribbean

Argentina
 Department of Agronomy, National University of the South
 Faculty of Agroindustries, National University of the Chaco Austral
 Faculty of Forest Engineering, National University of the Patagonia San Juan Bosco
 Faculty of Forest Sciences, National University of Misiones
 Institute of Forestry, National University of Cuyo
 National Agricultural Technology Institute (INTA)
Faculty of Agricultural and Forestry Science, National University of La Plata

Bolivia
 Faculty of Agronomy, Universidad Mayor de San Andrés (UMSA)
 Profession of Forest Engineering, Universidad Autónoma Gabriel René Moreno
 Profession of Forest Engineering, Universidad Autónoma Juan Misael Saracho
 Profession of Forest Engineering, Universidad Técnica del Beni Mariscal José Ballivian
 Technical School of Forestry, Universidad Mayor de San Simón

Brazil
 Department of Forest Sciences, Federal University of Paraná (UFPR), Curitiba, PR
 Department of Forest Sciences, Federal University of Santa Maria (UFSM), Santa Maria, RS
 Department of Forestry and Wood Sciences, Universidade Federal do Espirito Santo (UFES), Alegre, ES
 Department of Forestry Engineering, Federal University of The Valleys of Jequitinhonha and Mucuri - UFVJM
 Department of Forestry Engineering, University of Brasília (UnB), Brasília, DF
 Department of Forestry Sciences, Federal University of Viçosa (UFV), Viçosa, MG
 Department of Forestry Sciences, Federal University of Amazonas, AM
 Faculty of agricultural sciences (FCA) - Department of Forestry Sciences (DCF), Universidade Estadual Paulista (UNESP), Botucatu, SP
 Forestry Engineering Course, Campus Universitário Curitibanos, Federal University of Santa Catarina, UFSC, Curitibanos, SC
 Forestry Engineering Course, Federal University of São Carlos (UFSCar), Sorocaba, SP
 Forestry Engineering Course, Federal University of Technology - Paraná (UTFPR), Dois Vizinhos, PR
 Forestry Engineering Course, Federal University of Lavras, MG
 Forestry Engineering Course, Forestry Departament, State University of Midwestern Paraná - Paraná (UNICENTRO), Irati, PR
 Institute of Biodiversity and Forests, Federal University of Western Pará (UFOPA), Santarém, PA
 Forestry Engineering Course, Universidade do Estado do Pará (UEPA)
 Forestry Engineering Course, Universidade Federal de Sergipe (UFS)
 Forestry Engineering Course, University of São Paulo, SP
Superior School of Agriculture Luiz de Queiroz, University of São Paulo, Piracicaba
 Forestry Institute, Univesidade Federal Rural do Rio de Janeiro (UFRRJ), RJ
 Institute of Agrarian Sciences, Federal University of Minas Gerais, MG
 School of Agricultural Sciences, São Paulo State University, Botucatu, SP
 Forestry Engineering Course, Federal Rural University of Amazon (UFRA), Belém, Paragominas, PA.
 Forest Engineering Program, Santa Catarina State University (UDESC), Lages, Santa Catarina, SC.
 Forest Engineering Course, Universidade Federal do Tocantins (UFT), Gurupi, TO

Chile
 Faculty of Forest Sciences, Catholic University of the Maule
 Faculty of Forestry Sciences and Natural Resources, Universidad Austral de Chile (UACh)
 Department of Wood Sciences, University of the Bío Bío
 Faculty of Forest Sciences, University of Chile
 Faculty of Forestry Sciences, University of Concepción (UdeC)
 Faculty of Agricultural and Forest Sciences, University of La Frontera
 Faculty of Forest Sciences, University of Talca

Colombia
 National University of Colombia (Medellín)
 Universidad del Tolima (Ibagué)
 Universidad Distrital Francisco José de Caldas (Ingeniería Forestal, Bogotá)

Costa Rica
Costa Rica Institute of Technology (TEC)
 Regional Program of Silvicultural Management for Mesoamerica and the Caribbean, University of Costa Rica (UCR)
 Environmental Science School, National University of Costa Rica (UNA)
 School of Agronomy, National Learning Institute (INA)

Ecuador
 Faculty of Agronomic Sciences, Universidad Nacional de Loja
 School of Agroforestry, Escuela Superior Politécnica de Chimborazo
 School of Agronomic and Environmental Sciences, Pontificia Universidad Católica del Ecuador
 School of Forestry Engineering, Universidad Técnica Estatal de Quevedo

Guatemala
Centro Universitario del Petén (CUDEP)
Escuela Nacional Central de Agricultura (ENCAA)
Facultad de Agronomía, Universidad de San Carlos (FAUSAC)

Honduras
 Escuela Nacional de Ciencias Forestales (ESNACIFOR)
 Department of Biology, National Autonomous University of Honduras
 Universidad José Cecilio del Valle

Nicaragua
Universidad de las Regiones Autónomas de la Costa Caribe Nicaragüense (URACCAN)
Universidad Nacional Agraria (UNAA)

Panama
Faculty of Agricultural Sciences, University of Panama

Paraguay
Facultad de Ciencias Agrarias, National University

Peru
Facultad de Ciencias Forestales, La Molina National Agrarian University
Facultad de Ciencias Forestales y Medio Ambientales, Universidad de la Amazonia Peruana, Iquitos
Facultad de Ciencias Forestales y Medio Ambientales, Universidad del Centro del Perú, Huancayo
Facultad de Ciencias Forestales y Medio Ambientales, Universidad Nacional de Cajamarca
Facultad de Ciencias Forestales y Medio Ambientales, Universidad Nacional de Madre de Dios, Puerto Maldonado
Facultad de Ingeniería Forestal, Universidad Nacional de la Amazonia, Pucallpa
Facultad de Recursos Naturales, Universidad Nacional Agraria de la Selva, Tingo María

Trinidad and Tobago
Eastern Caribbean Institute of Agriculture and Forestry (ECIAF), University of Trinidad and Tobago

Uruguay
 Departamento de Producción Forestal y Tecnología de la Madera, Universidad de la República
 Facultad de Ciencias Agrarias, Universidad de la Empresa
 Universidad del Trabajo del Uruguay

See also

 Forest management
 Institute of technology
 List of agricultural universities and colleges
 List of colleges of natural resources
 List of forest research institutes
 List of historic schools of forestry
 List of tagged degrees
 World Forestry Congress

References

External links
 Euro Forest Portal, listing of "institutions, faculties and departments that provide forestry-related higher education in Europe", European Forestry Institute

 
List of forestry universities
Universities and colleges
Forestry
Lists of universities and colleges
 
 
Types of university or college